HBN may refer to:
 HBN Law, a law firm in Curaçao
 Healthy Building Network, an American green building non-profit
 Heiban language, spoken in Sudan
 Hexagonal boron nitride
 Hollingbourne railway station, in England
 Jacob Hübner (1761–1826), German entomologist
 Haemoglobin N (HbN), a globin protein